Mulara is a rural locality in the Livingstone Shire, Queensland, Australia.

Road infrastructure
The Rockhampton-Yeppoon Road (as Yeppoon Road) runs through from south to north-east.

Surf lake
Yeppoon Surf Lake opened in Mulara in 2018. Located at 1662 Yeppoon Road, the large wave pool was originally established by Surf Lakes International as a research and development facility and not open to the general public.  Surfer Mark Occhilupo was engaged as a surf industry advisor to the project. The site was upgraded in 2021 to include a learn-to-surf area.

Livingstone Shire Council gave approval on 18 January 2022 to the first stage of a proposed $187million development at the site which will see it open commercially and become a tourist attraction.  The first stage is expected to incorporate a skate park, a scuba hole, playground, tourist accommodation and a solar farm.

References 

Shire of Livingstone
Localities in Queensland